Ballet the Boxer 1 is the fourth studio album by the American rock band Ours, released on June 11, 2013 by Cage Recording Company.
 Ours released a music video for the song "Devil," which featured the final filmed performance by actor David Carradine and was directed by Michael Maxxis.

Track listing 
 "Pretty Pain" (5:11)
 "Emergency" (2:29)
 "Coming For You" (4:01)
 "Devil" (4:24)
 "Been Down" (5:54)
 "Stand" (3:49)
 "Boxer" (4:33)
 "Sing" (3:20)
 "Get Em Out" (3:13)
 "Fall into My Hands" (6:11)

Production
Produced by Jimmy Gnecco.
Additional production Henry Hirsch, Joey Barnes, and Brett Romnes.
Recorded, mixed, and mastered by Henry Hirsch at Waterfront Studios.

References

2013 albums
Ours (band) albums